Thottathellam Ponnagum is a 1975 Indian Tamil-language film directed by R. Vittal, and written by Panchu Arunachalam. The film stars Jaishankar and Jayachitra. It was released on 10 January 1975.

Plot

Cast 
 Jaishankar
 Jayachitra
 Manorama
 Sripriya
 K. A. Thangavelu
 V. K. Ramasamy
 Thengai Srinivasan
 Ashokan
 Vennira Aadai Moorthy

Production 
Thottathellam Ponnagum is Sripriya's fourth film as an actress, and was filmed in Salem. The film was written by Panchu Arunachalam, soon after the success of his previous film Kalyanamam Kalyanam (1974).

Soundtrack 
The music was composed by Vijaya Bhaskar, with lyrics by Kannadasan.

Release and reception 
Thottathellam Ponnagum was released on 10 January 1975. Kanthan of Kalki appreciated Vittal's direction and Dutt's cinematography but said there was nothing to say about the story, and lauded the comedy dialogues.

References

External links 
 

1970s Tamil-language films
Films scored by Vijaya Bhaskar
Films with screenplays by Panchu Arunachalam